Baldwin or Boudewijn I van Utrecht (died 10 May 995) was bishop of Utrecht from 990 to 995.

Baldwin came from the area around Bamberg. Nothing is known of his rule as bishop. He was buried in the Dom Church.

995 deaths
Bishops of Utrecht
10th-century bishops in Lotharingia
Burials at St. Martin's Cathedral, Utrecht
Year of birth unknown